Cornimont is a commune in the Vosges department in Grand Est in northeastern France.

History
A World War II tank battle was fought in Cornimont at Haut-du-Faing on 16 October 1944.

See also
Communes of the Vosges department

References

External links

 Official website 

Communes of Vosges (department)